Molledo is a municipality located in the autonomous community of Cantabria, Spain.

Localities
 Cobejo, 20 hab.
 Helguera, 122 hab.
 Molledo (Capital), 425 hab.
 San Martín de Quevedo, 236 hab.
 Santa Cruz, 188 hab.
 Santa Olalla, 159 hab.
 Silió, 620 hab.

References

Municipalities in Cantabria